Ahooab is a village in Ladiz Rural District, in the Mirjaveh of Zahedan County, Sistan and Baluchestan Province, Iran. At the 2006 census, its population was 27, in 7 families.

References

Populated places in Zahedan County